Hans Arne Jensen is a Danish botanist, agronomist, and writer.

Jensen earned a PhD at Agricultural University in Copenhagen, and then worked for 40 years for the Ministry of Agriculture, Plant Directorate, at the Danish state seed testing station. His researches in paleobotany include publications on organic macrofossils, on the germination of ancient seeds, and archaeological investigations into seeds and crops in Viking-era Danish towns.

Publications
 Macrofossils and their Contribution to the History of the Spermatophyte Flora in Southern Scandinavia from 13000 BC to 1536 AD
 Bibliography on Seed Morphology 1998
 Bibelens Planteverden (2004), English translation Plant World of the Bible (2012)

References

Living people
21st-century Danish botanists
Danish male writers
University of Copenhagen alumni
Year of birth missing (living people)
20th-century Danish botanists